Neochera inops is a moth in the family Erebidae. It is found from the north-eastern Himalaya to Sundaland and Palawan, including Bangladesh (Silhet), China (Hainan, Shaanxi, Yunnan), India (Assam, Darjeeling, Tamil Nadu), Indonesia (Borneo), Laos, Malaysia (Labuan, Perak), Myanmar, the Philippines (Balabac, Palawan, Mindoro), Sikkim, Thailand and northern Vietnam.

The wingspan is about 50 mm.

References

External links 
 The Moths of Borneo
 Species info

Aganainae
Moths described in 1854
Moths of Asia